Chullpa Q'asa (Quechua chullpa stone tomb, burial tower, q'asa mountain pass, "chullpa pass", also spelled Chullpa Khasa) is a  mountain in the Bolivian Andes. It is located in the Cochabamba Department, Mizque Province, Vila Vila Municipality. Chullpa Q'asa lies southwest  of Jatun Urqu.

References 

Mountains of Cochabamba Department